The National Basketball Association (NBA) was founded in 1946 and began operations as the Basketball Association of America (BAA). Following the BAA's merger with the National Basketball League (NBL), the BAA rebranded as the NBA. The 1949–50 NBA season marked the first season following the merger. 

The NBA has kept a record of its win–loss statistics since its inception. These records include wins and losses recorded during a team's playing time in the Basketball Association of America (BAA). Defunct BAA/NBA franchises are also accounted for, provided that they played at least one season in the BAA or NBA. The records do not count wins and losses recorded by a team's playing time in the American Basketball Association (ABA), despite the 1976 ABA–NBA merger. 

As of 2015, the San Antonio Spurs had the highest win–loss record percentage, with 2,261-1,442 (.611). The Boston Celtics have recorded the most wins, with 3,514.

The Sacramento Kings have recorded the most losses with 3,187. The Boston Celtics lead the association with the most played games, with 5,950. Conversely, the Pelicans have played the fewest overall games, with 1,604. Of teams established after the ABA–NBA merger, only the Dallas Mavericks and Miami Heat have a winning regular season record; the Heat are also the lone team founded post-merger to maintain a winning playoff record.

After the regular season, 12 teams (the top 6 seeds per conference) automatically clinch a playoff berth. Meanwhile, the 7th through 10th seeds in both conferences enter in a Play-in Tournament to determine both conferences' final two playoff seeds. Through the end of the 2022 Play-In Tournament, the Memphis Grizzlies have played the most Play-in games (3) and are tied with the Atlanta Hawks and New Orleans Pelicans for most Play-in wins (2). Five different teams have recorded the most Play-in losses (2), and have the lowest win–loss percentage with 0–2. Seven different teams are tied for the highest Play-in winning percentage (1.000), though only the Hawks and Pelicans have achieved that winning percentage with more than 1 Play-in game played.

As of the end of the 2022 NBA Finals, the Los Angeles Lakers have the most post-season games played (761), wins (456), and losses (305), as well as the highest post-season winning percentage with 456–305 of any NBA team. The Minnesota Timberwolves have the fewest post-season wins (20) and the lowest post-season winning percentage with 20–38. The New Orleans Pelicans have the fewest post-season games played (55).

Active franchises

Regular season

Play-in Tournament

The NBA introduced a Play-in Tournament in the 2019–20 NBA season to compensate for the suspension of the regular season and a difference in the amount of games played between teams, as a result of the COVID-19 pandemic. For the 2019–20 season, if a conference's 9th seed was within 4 games of the 8th seed in the standings, a play-in scenario between the two seeds would be triggered. The 8th seed would need to win one game, while the 9th seed would need to win two in the matchup. Ultimately, the Western Conference's Portland Trail Blazers and Memphis Grizzlies would face off in a Play-in game.

The future of the Play-in Tournament was then explored, with many reports concurring that it would indeed become a permanent fixture in the NBA. Due to the success of the Play-in tournament and the COVID-19 pandemic persisting into the NBA's 2020–21 season, the league installed a Play-in tournament involving both conference's 7th- through 10th-placed teams in the regular season standings. The format of the Play-in tournament involves the 7th-place team playing the 8th-place team with the winner clinching the 7th seed in the playoffs. The 9th-place team plays the 10th-place team with the loser being eliminated from playoff contention. The loser of the 7th-8th matchup will then play the winner of the 9th-10th matchup, with the winner clinching the 8th seed and the loser being eliminated.

Playoffs

Defunct franchises
17 BAA/NBA franchises are now defunct, although only 15 played games. The Baltimore Bullets have the most games played (450), wins (158), and losses (292) for a defunct NBA franchise. The Cleveland Rebels, Detroit Falcons, Indianapolis Jets, Pittsburgh Ironmen, and Toronto Huskies are all tied for fewest games played (60).

Only teams that recorded playing time in the BAA/NBA are included, as the NBA does not recap NBL statistics nor does it officially count ABA statistics.

Regular season

See also
List of NBA champions
List of NBA playoff series
List of NBA teams by single season win percentage
NBA regular season records
NBA post-season records

Notes

References

Win-loss records
NBA